Tom Schuberth (born December 27, 1957) is a former head men's basketball coach at the University of Texas-Pan American.

Head coaching record

References

1957 births
American men's basketball coaches
American men's basketball players
Basketball coaches from Illinois
Basketball players from Chicago
Living people
Louisiana–Monroe Warhawks men's basketball coaches
Memphis Tigers men's basketball coaches
Mississippi State Bulldogs men's basketball players
Sportspeople from Chicago
Southeast Missouri State Redhawks men's basketball coaches
UT Rio Grande Valley Vaqueros men's basketball coaches
UAB Blazers men's basketball coaches
UCF Knights men's basketball coaches